Valentin Radevich (born 3 February 1989 in Minsk) is a Belarusian footballer.

Career
Radevich began his career 1994 at the youth team of FC Dinamo Minsk. He left after nine years at Dinamo Minsk to sign for FC BATE Borisov in February 2006. He played since the 2007 season in the Belarusian Premier League team and moved in February 2010 on trial to Montreal Impact of USSF D2 Pro League. After a successful trial with Montreal Impact, the club signed the midfielder to their youth Academy, the Montreal Impact Academy in the Canadian Soccer League.

Honours
BATE Borisov
Belarusian Premier League champion: 2007, 2008

International career
Radevich is a former youth international player of Belarus and represented his country on U-17, U-19 and U-21 level.

Personal life
Radevich studies Arts and Science on the Université de Montréal and played for the Montreal Carabins soccer team. He is now completing a bachelor's degree in Physical Therapy at McGill University.

References

1989 births
Living people
Belarusian footballers
FC BATE Borisov players
Footballers from Minsk
Expatriate soccer players in Canada
Association football midfielders
Belarusian expatriate sportspeople in Canada
Montreal Impact U23 players
Canadian Soccer League (1998–present) players
Belarusian expatriate footballers
Belarus youth international footballers
Belarus under-21 international footballers